Tomáš Kucharčík (born May 10, 1970) is a Czech former professional ice hockey player. He was selected by the Toronto Maple Leafs in the 8th round (167th overall) of the 1991 NHL Entry Draft.

Kucharčík played for the gold medal-winning Czech Republic team at the 1999 IIHF World Championship.

Career statistics

Regular season and playoffs

International

References

External links

1970 births
Living people
People from Vlašim
Ässät players
BK Mladá Boleslav players
Czech ice hockey centres
Czechoslovak ice hockey centres
EHC Freiburg players
HC Ambrì-Piotta players
HC Dukla Jihlava players
HC Forward-Morges players
HC Plzeň players
HC Slavia Praha players
HC Tábor players
HK Nitra players
HPK players
Leksands IF players
Lukko players
Orli Znojmo players
Wipptal Broncos players
St. John's Maple Leafs players
Toronto Maple Leafs draft picks
VHK Vsetín players
Sportspeople from the Central Bohemian Region
Czech expatriate ice hockey players in Canada
Czech expatriate ice hockey players in Finland
Czech expatriate ice hockey players in Sweden
Czech expatriate ice hockey players in Germany
Czech expatriate ice hockey players in Slovakia
Czech expatriate ice hockey players in Switzerland
Czech expatriate sportspeople in Italy
Czech expatriate sportspeople in Austria
Expatriate ice hockey players in Italy
Expatriate ice hockey players in Austria